The Hottentot is a 1922 American silent comedy film directed by James W. Horne and Del Andrews and starred Douglas MacLean. It is based on the 1920 Broadway play The Hottentot by William Collier, Sr. and Victor Mapes.  Thomas H. Ince produced the feature with distribution by Associated First National.

The story was refilmed by Warner Brothers as The Hottentot in 1929 as an early Vitaphone talkie.

Cast
Raymond Hatton as Swift
Madge Bellamy as Peggy Fairfax
Douglas MacLean as Sam Harrington
Lila Leslie as Mrs. Carol Chadwick
Martin Best as Ollie Gilford
Truly Shattuck as Mrs. May Gilford
T. D. Crittenden as Major Reggie Townsend (credited as Dwight Crittendon)
Bert Lindley as McKesson
Stanhope Wheatcroft as Larry Crawford

Preservation status
It survives incomplete.

References

External links

Lobby poster

1922 films
American silent feature films
Films directed by James W. Horne
First National Pictures films
American films based on plays
American horse racing films
American black-and-white films
1920s sports comedy films
American sports comedy films
1922 comedy films
1920s American films
Silent American comedy films
1920s English-language films
Silent sports comedy films